The Clausura 2017 Liga MX championship stage commonly known as liguilla (mini league) was being played from 10 May to 28 May 2017.  A total of eight teams were competing in the championship stage to decide the champions of the Clausura 2017 Liga MX season. Both finalists qualified to the 2018 CONCACAF Champions League. However, since UANL had already qualified for that tournament by winning the Apertura 2016 Liga MX final, their berth earned through the Clausura passed to the non-finalist with the best regular season record in the Clausura, Tijuana.

Qualified teams

Format
Teams are re-seeded each round.
Team with more goals on aggregate after two matches advances.
Away goals rule is applied in the quarterfinals and semifinals, but not the final.
In the quarterfinals and semifinals, if the two teams are tied on aggregate and away goals, the higher seeded team advances.
In the final, if the two teams are tied after both legs, the match goes to extra time and, if necessary, a shoot-out.
Both finalists qualify to the 2018 CONCACAF Champions League (in Pot 3).

Bracket

Quarterfinals

|}

All times are UTC−6 except for match in Tijuana

First leg

Second leg

UANL won 6–1 on aggregate.

Toluca won 5–4 on aggregate.

1–1 on aggregate and tied on away goals. Guadalajara advanced for being the higher seed in the classification table.

Tijuana won 2–1 on aggregate.

Semifinals

|}

All times are UTC−6 except for match in Tijuana

First leg

Second leg

2–2 on aggregate and tied on away goals. Guadalajara advanced for being the higher seed in the classification table.

UANL won 4–0 on aggregate.

Finals

|}

All times are UTC−6

First leg

Second leg

Guadalajara won 4–3 on aggregate

Goalscorers
6 goals
 André-Pierre Gignac (UANL)

3 goals
 Fernando Uribe (Toluca)

2 goals
 Javier Aquino (UANL)
 Jesús Dueñas (UANL)
 Alan Pulido (Guadalajara)
 Rodolfo Pizarro (Guadalajara)

1 goal
 Matías Alustiza (Atlas)
 José María Basanta (Monterrey)
 Néstor Calderón (Guadalajara)
 Jürgen Damm (UANL)
 Carlos Esquivel (Toluca)
 Julio Furch (Santos Laguna)
 Gabriel Hauche (Toluca)
 Juan Martín Lucero (Tijuana)
 Henry Martín (Tijuana)
 Orbelín Pineda (Guadalajara)
 Antonio Ríos (Toluca)
 Ulises Rivas (Santos Laguna)
 Jonathan Rodríguez (Santos Laguna)
 Miguel Sansores (Morelia)
 Ismael Sosa (UANL)
 Enrique Triverio (Toluca)
 José Juan Vázquez (Guadalajara)
 Lucas Zelarayán (UANL)

Own goals
 Enrique Triverio (for Santos Laguna)

References

 
1
Liga MX seasons